Armando Méndez de la Luz (born 27 August 1951) is a Mexican politician affiliated with the Convergence. As of 2014 he served as Senator of the LVIII and LIX Legislatures of the Mexican Congress representing Veracruz.

References 

1951 births
Living people
People from Veracruz (city)
Members of the Senate of the Republic (Mexico)
Citizens' Movement (Mexico) politicians
Politicians from Veracruz
21st-century Mexican politicians
Municipal presidents in Veracruz
Universidad Veracruzana alumni
Monterrey Institute of Technology and Higher Education alumni
Academic staff of Universidad Veracruzana
20th-century Mexican politicians